Scuffletown is an unincorporated community in Orange County, Virginia. It lies at an elevation of 571 feet (174 m).

References

Unincorporated communities in Orange County, Virginia
Unincorporated communities in Virginia